Andreas Kunz (24 July 1946 – 1 January 2022) was a German Nordic combined athlete. His best-known finish was a bronze at the 1968 Winter Olympics in Grenoble in the Individual event. He competed for the SV Dynamo/SC Dynamo Klingenthal. Kunz died on 1 January 2022, at the age of 75.

References

External links
 

1946 births
2022 deaths
German male Nordic combined skiers
Olympic Nordic combined skiers of East Germany
Olympic medalists in Nordic combined
Nordic combined skiers at the 1968 Winter Olympics
Olympic bronze medalists for East Germany
Sportspeople from Leipzig
Medalists at the 1968 Winter Olympics